James Patrick Herron (1894 – December 20, 1967) was an American football player and coach. He played at end for the University of Pittsburgh's football team from 1913 to 1916.

Biography
A member of the Panthers' undefeated national championship teams coached by Pop Warner in 1915 and 1916, Herron earned first team All-American honors in 1916. Following graduation, Herron served as first assistant coach to Warner before being leaving to become the head coach at Indiana University Bloomington in 1922. He also served as the head coach at Duke University in 1925 and at Washington and Lee University from 1926 to 1928.  Herron, who also earned a law degree, served in the aviation service during World War I and was credited for bringing down two German planes.  Herron died at the age of 73 on December 20, 1967 at Monongahela Memorial Hospital in Monongahela, Pennsylvania.

Head coaching record

References

External links

1894 births
1967 deaths
American football ends
Duke Blue Devils football coaches
Indiana Hoosiers football coaches
Massillon Tigers players
Pittsburgh Panthers football coaches
Pittsburgh Panthers football players
Washington and Lee Generals football coaches
All-American college football players
United States Army Air Forces personnel of World War II
United States Army Air Forces officers
United States Army Air Service pilots of World War I
Pennsylvania lawyers
People from Monessen, Pennsylvania
Coaches of American football from Pennsylvania
Players of American football from Pennsylvania